Edgar Nelson Transeau (1875–1960) was an American botanist and phycologist who served as president of the Botanical Society of America and the Ecological Society of America. Transeau was born in Williamsport, Pennsylvania, on October 21, 1875, and graduated from Franklin & Marshall College in 1897. He received a PhD from the University of Michigan in 1904, and in 1915 joined the faculty of Ohio State University where he spent the majority of his career, becoming professor emeritus in 1946.

References

External links

1875 births
1960 deaths
20th-century American botanists
People from Williamsport, Pennsylvania
Franklin & Marshall College alumni
University of Michigan alumni
Ohio State University faculty
American phycologists